The 2012 6 Hours of Silverstone was held at Silverstone on 26 August 2012, and was the fourth round in the 2012 FIA World Endurance Championship season. Audi claimed the LMP1 Manufacturers' World Championship with an overall victory at the event.

Qualifying

Qualifying result
Pole position winners in each class are marked in bold.

Notes:
 —The No. 32 car of Lotus started from the pit lane.

Race

Race result
Class winners in bold.  Cars failing to complete 70% of winner's distance marked as Not Classified (NC).

Note: After finishing 2nd in LMGTE Am class, the No. 50 Larbre Corvette was excluded following the race for a failure to meet safety requirements (validity of the fire extinguisher).

References

6 Hours of Silverstone
Silverstone
Silverstone 6 Hours
Silverstone 6 Hours